Sorsele Municipality is a municipality in Västerbotten County in northern Sweden. Its seat is located in Sorsele.

Sorsele Municipality covers an area of 8,012 km2. It is the eleventh largest municipality by size, but has the second smallest population.

The municipality has not been affected by the two local government reforms of the 20th century, but has had its large size since the municipal system was implemented in 1863.

The name appears to stem from the Sami word sourge, which means branch, and sel, which is of Swedish origin and refers to a kind of stream. This refers to the protected Vindel River (Swedish: Vindelälven), which flows through the town and municipality of Sorsele.

Geography wise, around half of the municipal area is part of the Vindelfjällens Nature Reserve.

Localities
There is only one locality (or urban area) in Sorsele Municipality:

References

External links

Sorsele Municipality - Official site 

Municipalities of Västerbotten County